Cristinelli Fermin (born July 23, 1956), professionally known as Cristy Fermin, is a Filipino talk show host. She finished her bachelor's degree in journalism at the Lyceum of the Philippines University.

Career
She started her career as a political journalist, but soon turned towards writing for tabloids, about movie stars and other celebrities. Her first television appearance was when she became the main host of the weekend showbiz talk show Movie Magazine on GMA Network in 1987. In 1992, ABS-CBN hired Fermin to host the Sunday talk show Showbiz Lingo with Butch Francisco. Fermin's participation as main host of Showbiz Lingo had the blessings from her producers Inday Badiday, and did not run in conflict with Movie Magazine, which aired on Saturdays. But in 1994, Cristy eventually left Movie Magazine and GMA Network after she signed an exclusive talent contract with ABS-CBN, which in return capitalized on Cristy's new title as the '90s "Queen of Intrigues" by giving her the daily talk show Cristy Per Minute which started airing in 1995. During this period, her residence was in Valenzuela, Metro Manila.

Fermin also appeared in the 2003 Showbiz Gossip Series S2: Showbiz Sabado with Edu Manzano and talent manager/host Alfie Lorenzo. She also appeared in the showbiz talk show The Buzz, with main hosts Boy Abunda and Kris Aquino.

Fermin was suspended by the ABS-CBN management effective October 15, 2008, until December 31, 2008, on both The Buzz and the radio program Showbiz Mismo of DZMM, due to controversial rift issues between her and former actress Nadia Montenegro.

In April 2008, the Supreme Court of the Philippines affirmed a libel conviction and ordered her to pay a fine and damages to couple Anabelle Rama and Eddie Gutierrez instead of serving a jail term previously issued by a lower court.

In 2010, Cristy Fermin returned on TV5 (now 5) as one of the main hosts of the weekly showbiz talk show Paparazzi. She was joined by Mo Twister and former The Buzz co-host Ruffa Gutierrez. She is also a co-host of Juicy! with original hosts Alex Gonzaga and IC Mendoza.

On November 8, 2010, she returned to radio when her entertainment news program, Cristy FerMinute, was launched on Radyo5 92.3 News FM. The said program is also simulcast on AksyonTV (now One PH).

On July 28, 2012, TV5 Network Inc. canceled Paparazzi, while Juicy! was canceled on August 3. Cristy began hosting Ang Latest on August 4 of the same year.

Filmography

Television shows

Radio shows

Film
As public relations officer

References

External links

1958 births
Living people
People from Nueva Ecija
People from Valenzuela, Metro Manila
Lyceum of the Philippines University alumni
Filipino television talk show hosts
Filipino women television presenters
GMA Network personalities
ABS-CBN personalities
TV5 (Philippine TV network) personalities